Boma Airstrip is an airport in South Sudan.

Location
Boma Airstrip  is located in Pibor County, Jonglei State, in eastern South Sudan, near the town of Towot.

The geographic coordinates of this airport are: 6° 10' 50.74"N, 34° 23' 20.62"E (Latitude: 6.180763; Longitude: 34.389063). The elevation of Boma Airstrip is unknown. The airport has a single unpaved runway, the dimensions of which are not publicly known at this time.

Overview
Boma Airstrip is a small civilian airport that serves the town of Towot and Boma National Park. There are no known scheduled airlines serving this airport at this time, but the United Nations Humanitarian Air Service served the field from Juba International Airport.

See also
 Jonglei
 List of airports in South Sudan

References

External links
 Location of Boma Airstrip At Google Maps

Airports in South Sudan
Jonglei State